Praedora is a genus of moths in the family Sphingidae. The genus was erected by Walter Rothschild and Karl Jordan in 1903.

Species
Praedora leucophaea Rothschild & Jordan, 1903
Praedora marshalli Rothschild & Jordan, 1903
Praedora plagiata Rothschild & Jordan, 1903
Praedora puchneri Pierre & Schmit, 2008
Praedora tropicalis Rothschild & Jordan, 1912

References

Sphingini
Moth genera
Taxa named by Walter Rothschild
Taxa named by Karl Jordan